"Right Before Your Eyes" (popularly known as "Rudolph Valentino") is a song written by Ian Thomas and introduced on his 1977 album Goodnight Mrs. Calabash. His version reached #57 in Canada. It was also recorded by America for their 1982 album View from the Ground. The America version of "Right Before Your Eyes" was issued as that album's second single – following up America's Top Ten single "You Can Do Magic" – and rose to #45 on the Billboard Hot 100: the track's  Adult Contemporary chart peak was #16. It reached 22 on the Contemporary Adult chart in Canada. "Right Before Your Eyes" was most popular in the Philippines during its release in 1982.

Charts

References

External links
  Ian Thomas Band 
  Ian Thomas
  America

1982 singles
America (band) songs
Capitol Records singles
Rudolph Valentino
1977 songs
Songs written by Ian Thomas (Canadian musician)
Song recordings produced by Russ Ballard